Bonabes, Comte de Rougé (4 June 1891 Les Essarts, Vendée – 25 October 1975 Bern) was a member of the French noble de Rougé Family, and served as the Secretary General of the Red Cross from 1936 to 1957.

Quotation
"Peace is more than the absence of war."

References

Beyond conflict: the International Federation of Red Cross and Red Crescent Societies 1919-1994, Daphne A. Reid, Patrick F. Gilbo, International Federation of Red Cross and Red Crescent Societies, 1997, 

Red Cross personnel
1891 births
1975 deaths
Counts of Rougé